The Council of Ministers (Spanish: Consejo de ministros), also referred to as simply the Cabinet of Cuba, is the highest ranking executive and administrative body of the Republic of Cuba, and constitutes the nation's government. It consists of the President, the First Vice President and the five Vice Presidents of the Council of State, the Secretary of the Executive Committee, the heads of the national ministries, and other members as established by law.

The Executive Committee is a smaller body, consisting of the President and Vice Presidents of the Council of State, the Secretary and those ministers chosen by the President.
The Council of Ministers is responsible for the implementation of policy agreements authorized by the National Assembly of People’s Power. These agreements are designated to individual ministries. The council also proposes general plans for economic and social development, which are in turn authorized by the National Assembly twice yearly.

The Council of Ministers also directs Cuba's foreign policy and its relations with other governments; approves international treaties before passing them over for ratification of the Council of State; directs and oversees foreign trade and the State budget. The Council of Ministers enforces laws authorized by the National Assembly, which are passed by the Council of State.

As a result of a referendum which was held on February 24, 2019, the Council of Ministers, and its power over the Cuban government, will be led by a Prime Minister.

Current members

The body, was reformed in December 2019 with the appointment of Manuel Marrero Cruz as Prime Minister - the first with that title in 43 years - and six new ministers. It currently consists of:

See also

List of prime ministers of Cuba

References

External links
(Spanish) https://web.archive.org/web/20110209123658/http://www.cubagob.cu/ - tag "Miembros" (members)
(Spanish) http://www.parlamentocubano.cu/index.php?option=com_content&view=article&id=49&Itemid=96

Government ministers of Cuba
Government of Cuba
Cuba, Council of Ministers
Government agencies established in 1975
1975 establishments in Cuba